Mungonya is an administrative ward in Kigoma District of Kigoma Region in Tanzania. 
According to the 2012 census, the ward has a total population of 12,644.

References

Wards of Kigoma Region